Gibraltarian status is a legal status in Gibraltar law defined by the Gibraltarian Status Act, 1962. Persons with Gibraltarian status are registered on the Register of Gibraltarians.

History

The term was coined in the 1920s at a time of increasing awareness of national identity and was popularised during World War II, when the civil population of Gibraltar was evacuated to the United Kingdom and other parts of the British Empire. In 1962, the term was made a legal status in Gibraltar through the Gibraltarian Status Ordinance (1962). The Ordinance became the Gibraltarian Status Act, 1962 following the implementation of the Gibraltar Constitution Order 2006.

The Register of Gibraltarians pre-dates Gibraltarian status - the register was created in 1955 while Gibraltarian status originates with the Gibraltarian Status Act, 1962. The 1962 Act provides a legal framework for the register, and defines who is eligible to be listed on the register.

Eligibility for Gibraltarian status
The following is a summary of the eligibility for Gibraltarian status contained in the 1962 Act. See the text of the act for full details.

A person is eligible to be registered as a Gibraltarian if they are a British national and:

(a) They were born in Gibraltar on or before the 30th day of June 1925; or
(b) They are child of a person born in Gibraltar on or before the 30th day of June 1925; or
(c) They are the descendant of a person entitled to be registered by virtue of (a) or (b) and their parent or grandparent was born in Gibraltar; or
(d) They were born in Gibraltar and are the child of a person who is registered in the register; or
(e) They are married to a person entitled to be register by virtue of (a, b, c or d) or are the widow or widower of such a person.

Further provisions provide for the registration of adopted children.

Additionally, a person may be registered as a Gibraltarian at the discretion of the Government of Gibraltar minister with responsibility for personal status, if they satisfy the minister that:

(a) they are a British Overseas Territories citizen by virtue of their connection with Gibraltar or the United Kingdom as their country of origin;
(b) they are a British national;
(c) they are of good character;
(d) they have sufficient knowledge of the English language;
(e) they have their permanent home in Gibraltar;
(f) they have been resident in Gibraltar for a continuous period of ten years immediately preceding the date of application
(g) they intend to make their permanent home in Gibraltar.

Further provisions provide for the registration of children, adopted children and spouses of those registered at the discretion of the minister with responsibility for personal status.

Rights
Persons with Gibraltarian status have full right of residence in Gibraltar. Any Gibraltarian who is a British Overseas Territories citizen and/or a British citizen was a citizen of the European Union until Brexit and enjoyed freedom of movement in the European Union.

On 31 December 2020, the governments of Spain and the United Kingdom reached a deal to allow Gibraltar to join the Schengen area.

References

See also
 History of nationality in Gibraltar
 Gibraltar passport
 Gibraltarian people
 List of Gibraltarians
 Belonger status

Gibraltar law
Society of Gibraltar
Nationality law in British Overseas Territories